Shingo Kunieda defeated the two-time defending champion Alfie Hewett in the final, 6–3, 3–6, 7–6(7–3) to win the men's singles wheelchair tennis title at the 2020 US Open. It was his seventh US Open singles title and 24th major singles title overall.

Seeds

Draw

Finals

References

External links 
 Draw

Wheelchair Men's Singles
U.S. Open, 2020 Men's Singles